Harkless is a surname. Notable people with the surname include:

Lawrence B. Harkless, American physician
Maurice Harkless (born 1993), American basketball player

See also
Arkless